The Lilleberge Viking Burial or Lilleberge Ship Burial is a major hoard of Viking objects found in a barrow at Lilleberge in Namdalen, central Norway in the late nineteenth century.  Since 1891, it has been an important part of the British Museum's early medieval collection.

Discovery

Lilleberge is located in Nord-Trøndelag county in the district of Namdalen. A large ship barrow in the vicinity of Lilleberge was excavated in the 1886 by the British archaeologist, Alfred Heneage Cocks. The barrow was over 40 metres in length and contained a ship that was 10 metres long. Cocks later took all the finds to England and sold them to the British Museum in 1891.

Description
The grave group from Lilleberge represents an important assemblage of Viking jewellery and other artefacts that belonged to a prominent female dignitary from the local tribe. Probably the most significant object from the burial is the almost intact whalebone plaque which may have served as a cutting board for food or as a surface to smooth items of clothing.

Other objects from Lilleberge include a pair of copper alloy oval brooches, necklaces made of coloured glass beads, a spindle-whorl, a gilded Celtic mount (that was only recently discovered in the British Museum's stores), an iron pot stand, rivets from a Viking boat and skeletal remains from the deceased.

See also
Scar boat burial for a similar whalebone plaque
Port an Eilean Mhòir ship burial
Tromsø Burial
Tumulus burial from Villa Farm in Vestnes

References

Further reading
Marzinzik S, "Masterpieces: Early Medieval Art", (London, British Museum Press, 2013)
Graham-Campbell J, Viking Artefacts: A Select Catalogue, (London, British Museum Press, 1980)
Graham-Campbell J, Viking Art, Thames & Hudson, 2013
Williams, G., Pentz, P. and Wemhoff, M. (eds), Vikings: Life and Legend, (London, British Museum Press, 2014)

Medieval European objects in the British Museum
Viking ship burials
 
1886 archaeological discoveries